Fairhaven or Fair Haven may refer to:

Places

Australia 
Fairhaven, Victoria
 Fairhaven, an area of French Island

Canada 
Fairhaven, Saskatoon, Saskatchewan
Fairhaven, Deer Island, New Brunswick
Fair Haven, Newfoundland and Labrador

Norway 
 Fairhaven (Svalbard)

United Kingdom 
 Fairhaven, Lancashire

United States 
 Fair Haven, Illinois
 Fair Haven, New Haven, a neighborhood in New Haven, Connecticut
 Fair Haven, Michigan
 Fair Haven, Missouri
 Fair Haven, New Jersey
 Fair Haven, New York
 Fair Haven, Vermont
 Fair Haven (CDP), Vermont
 Fair Haven Heights, New Haven, Connecticut
 Fairhaven, Alaska
 Fairhaven, California
 Fairhaven, Kansas
 Fairhaven, Massachusetts
 Fairhaven, Anne Arundel County, Maryland
 Fairhaven, Carroll County, Maryland
 Fairhaven, Frederick County, Maryland
 Fairhaven, Minnesota
 Fairhaven, Ohio
 Fairhaven, Oregon, in Klamath County
 Fairhaven, Washington (now merged with the town of Bellingham)
 Fairhaven, West Virginia
 Fairhaven Township (disambiguation), including Fair Haven Township

Education
 Fairhaven School (Upper Marlboro, Maryland), a democratic school built on the Sudbury model
 Fairhaven College, a school within Western Washington University in Bellingham, Washington
 Fairhaven Baptist College, in Chesterton, Indiana
 Fairhaven High School, in Fairhaven, Massachusetts

Transportation
 Ansdell and Fairhaven railway station, in Lytham St Annes, Lancashire, United Kingdom
 Fairhaven Branch Railroad, a former short-line railroad in Massachusetts, United States
 Fairhaven Bridge Light, located on the bridge between New Bedford and Fairhaven, Massachusetts, United States 
 Fairhaven Station (Amtrak), in Bellingham, Washington, United States
 Fairhaven (sternwheeler), an 1889 sternwheel steamboat of the Puget Sound Mosquito Fleet

Other
 "Fair Haven" (Star Trek: Voyager), an episode of the Star Trek: Voyager television series
 Fairhaven (film), a 2012 American comedy film by Tom O'Brien
 Fair Haven (film), a 2016 independent film starring Tom Wopat
 Fairhaven, a city in the fantasy novel series The Saga of Recluce, where the February 2021 novel is titled Fairhaven Rising
 Fairhaven, Kent, a fictitious village in Richard Osman's first novel The Thursday Murder Club